Trishank Gupta (born 24 September 2001) is an Indian cricketer. He made his Twenty20 debut for Hyderabad in the 2021–22 Syed Mushtaq Ali Trophy on 9 November 2021. He made his List-A debut for the Hyderabad in the 2021–22 Vijay Hazare Trophy on 8 December 2021.

References

External links
 

2001 births
Living people
Indian cricketers
Hyderabad cricketers
Place of birth missing (living people)